The 1960 Ballon d'Or, given to the best football player in Europe as judged by a panel of sports journalists from UEFA member countries, was awarded to Luis Suárez on 13 December 1960.

Rankings

Notes

References

External links
 France Football Official Ballon d'Or page

1960
1959–60 in European football